Klæbu is a village in Trondheim Municipality in Trøndelag county, Norway. The village sits at the junction of Norwegian county roads 805 and 921. The historic Klæbu Church is located in the village.

The village was the administrative centre of the old Klæbu Municipality prior to 2020 when it was merged into Trondheim.

The newspaper KlæbuPosten is published in Klæbu.

References

Villages in Trøndelag
Klæbu